The Van Buren Women's Literary Club is one of the oldest surviving literary societies of its type in the nation, founded in 1896 to improve the education of its members by providing access to books.  The society is located at 421 Webster Street in Van Buren, Arkansas, in a historic Presbyterian church building built in 1903 on the foundations of the 1844 Old School Presbyterian Church.  The building is a vernacular brick building with Late Gothic Revival features, supposedly designed by Reverend Finney, the pastor of the local Baptist church.  The building was used as a church until 1919, when the Old School Church merged with other Presbyterian congregations.  After serving briefly as the meeting house for a chapter of the Loyal Order of Moose, a fraternal organization, it was acquired by the Literary Club in 1921, and served as Van Buren's library until the 1970s.  Although Van Buren now has a separate public library, the society maintains a small library on the premises.

The society's building was listed on the National Register of Historic Places in 2009.

References

Presbyterian churches in Arkansas
Churches on the National Register of Historic Places in Arkansas
Gothic Revival church buildings in Arkansas
Churches completed in 1903
Churches in Crawford County, Arkansas
National Register of Historic Places in Crawford County, Arkansas
Buildings and structures in Van Buren, Arkansas